Maria Szymanowska (born Marianna Agata Wołowska; Warsaw, 14 December 1789 – 25 July 1831, St. Petersburg, Russia) was a Polish composer and one of the first professional virtuoso pianists of the 19th century.  She toured extensively throughout Europe, especially in the 1820s, before settling permanently in St. Petersburg. In the Russian imperial capital, she composed for the court, gave concerts, taught music, and ran an influential salon.

She was the mother of Celina Szymanowska, who married the Polish Romantic poet Adam Mickiewicz.

Biography
Marianna Agata Wołowska was born in Warsaw, Poland on 14 December 1789 into a prosperous Polish family with Frankist Jewish roots, one of her ancestors being Salomon Ben Elijah (or Jacob ben Judah Leib/Jacob Leibowicz), the personal assistant of Jacob Frank. Her father Franciszek Wołowski was a landlord and a brewer. Her mother Barbara Wołowska (née Lanckorońska) came from a noble Polish Lanckoroński family. The history of her early years and especially her musical studies is uncertain; she appears to have studied piano with Antoni Lisowski and Tomasz Gremm, and composition with Franciszek Lessel, Józef Elsner and Karol Kurpiński. She gave her first public recitals in Warsaw and Paris in 1810.

In the same year, she married Józef Szymanowski (d. 1832), with whom she had three children while living in Poland: Helena (1811–61), who married a Polish lawyer Franciszek Malewski, and twins Celina (1812–55), who married Adam Mickiewicz, and Romuald (1812–40), who became an engineer). The children remained with Maria after her separation from Szymanowski in 1820. The marriage ended in divorce.

Szymanowska died of cholera during the summer 1831 epidemic in St Petersburg.

She is presumed to be unrelated to Karol Szymanowski, considered to be the most famous Polish composer of the 20th century.

Performances

Her professional piano career began in 1815, with performances in England in 1818, a tour of Western Europe 1823–1826, including both public and private performances in Germany, France, England (on multiple occasions), Italy, Belgium and Holland. A number of these performances were given in private for royalty; in England alone during 1824, her performance schedule included concerts at the Royal Philharmonic Society (18 May 1824), Hanover Square (11 June 1824, with members of the royal family present) and other performances for several English dukes.

From 1822 - 1823, Szymanowska toured in many cities in the 19th century Russian territories, including Moscow, Kiev, Riga and, St Petersburg. There she performed at the Imperial Court and received the title of First Pianist. In St Petersburg, Maria met Johann Nepomuk Hummel and performed with him.

In 1824, Maria performed for the Royal Philharmonic Society in London (May 18), at Hanover Square for the royal family (June 11), and at several private houses for dukes of Hamilton, Kent and Northumberland.

Her playing was very well received by critics and audiences alike, garnering her a reputation for a delicate tone, lyrical sense of virtuosity and operatic freedom. She was one of the first professional piano virtuosos in 19th-century Europe and one of the first pianists to perform memorized repertoire in public, a decade ahead of Franz Liszt and Clara Schumann. After years of touring, she returned to Warsaw for some time before relocating in early 1828, first to Moscow and then to St. Petersburg, where she served as the court pianist to the Empress of Russia Alexandra Feodorovna.

Compositions

Szymanowska composed around 100 piano pieces. Like many women composers of her time, she wrote music predominantly for instrumentation she had access to, including many solo piano pieces and miniatures, songs, and some chamber works. Her work is typically labeled, stylistically, as part of the pre-romantic period  and of Polish Sentimentalism. Szymanowska scholar Sławomir Dobrzański describes her playing and its historical significance as follows:
Her Etudes and Preludes show innovative keyboard writing; the Nocturne in B flat is her most mature piano composition; Szymanowska's Mazurkas represent one of the first attempts at stylization of the dance; Fantasy and Caprice contain an impressive vocabulary of pianistic technique; her polonaises follow the tradition of polonaise-writing created by Michal Kleofas Ogiński. Szymanowska's musical style is parallel to the compositional starting point of Frédéric Chopin; many of her compositions had an obvious impact on Chopin's mature musical language.

While scholars have debated the reach of her influence on her compatriot Chopin, her career as a pianist and composer strikingly foreshadows his own, as well as the broader trend in 19th-century Europe of the virtuoso pianist/composer, whose abilities as a performer expanded her technical possibilities as a composer.

Reputation
Because of her stature as a performance artist and because of her salon, Szymanowska developed a strong web of connections with some of the most notable composers, performing musicians, and poets of her day, including: Ludwig van Beethoven, Luigi Cherubini, Frederic Chopin, Gioacchino Rossini, Johann Hummel, John Field; Pierre Baillot, Giuditta Pasta; Johann Wolfgang von Goethe and Adam Mickiewicz.  Beethoven, Hummel and Field dedicated compositions to her. Goethe is rumored to have fallen deeply in love with her.  The salon she established in St. Petersburg drew especially prominent crowds, augmenting her status as a court musician.

Modern Works
Album per pianoforte. Maria Szmyd-Dormus, ed. Kraków: PWM, 1990.
25 Mazurkas. Irena Poniatowska, ed. Bryn Mawr, PA: Hildegard, 1991.
Music for Piano. Sylvia Glickman, ed. Bryn Mawr, PA: Hildegard, 1991.
Six Romances. Maja Trochimczyk, ed. Bryn Mawr, PA: Hildegard, 1998.

Discography
Szymanowska: Complete Dances for Solo Piano. Alexander Kostrita, piano. Grand Piano GP685, 2015
Three Generations of Mazurkas: Polish dances for Piano by Szymanowska, Chopin, Szymanowski. Alexander Kostrita, piano. Divine Art DDA25123, 2014
Maria Szymanowska: Complete Piano Works. Sławomir P. Dobrzański, piano. Acte Préalable AP0281-83, 2013 AP0281-83.
Maria Szymanowska: Ballades & Romances. Elżbieta Zapolska, mezzo-soprano; Bart van Oort,  fortepiano Broadwood 1825. Acte Préalable AP0260, 2012 AP0260.
Maria Szymanowska: Piano Works. Anna Ciborowska, piano. Dux, 2004.
Szymanowska: Album. Carole Carniel, piano. Ligia Digital, 2005.
Alla Polacca:  Chopin et l'école polonaise de piano. Jean-Pierre Armengaud, piano. Mandala : Distribution Harmonia Mundi, 2000.
Inspiration to Chopin. Karina Wisniewska, piano. Denon, 2000.
Riches and Rags: A Wealth of Piano Music by Women. Nancy Fierro, piano. Ars Musica Poloniae, 1993.

See also
 Celina Szymanowska (Maria Szymanowska's daughter; Adam Mickiewicz's wife)
 List of Poles

References

Further reading
Chechlińska, Zofia (2001). Szymanowska [née Wołowska], Maria Agata, in Grove Music Online, ed. L. Macy. (Accessed February 13, 2007).
Fierro, Nancy (1987). Maria Agata Szymanowska, 1789-1831. In: the Historical Anthology of Music by Women, edited by James R. Briscoe, 101-102. Bloomington and Indianapolis: Indiana University Press. Includes an edition of her Nocturne in B-flat Major.
 Sarah Hanks Karlowicz (1998). Maria Szymanowska (1789–1831). In: Women Composers. Music Through the Ages, edited by Sylvia Glickman & Martha Furman Schleifer, Vol. 5, New York 1998, 364–369.
 Maria Anna Harley (1998). Maria Szymanowska (1789–1831). In: Women Composers. Music Through the Ages, edited by Sylvia Glickman & Martha Furman Schleifer, Vol. 4, New York 1998, 396–420.
Iwanejko, Maria (1959). Maria Szymanowska. Kraków: P.W.M.
Kijas, Anna (2010). Maria Szymanowska (1789-1831): A Bio-Bibliography. Lanham: Scarecrow Press.
Swartz, Anne (1985). "Maria Szymanowska and the Salon Music of the Early Nineteenth Century." The Polish Review 30 (1): 43–58.

External links
Dobrzanski, Sławomir. "Maria Szymanowska - Bibliography." Polish Music Journal 5, no. 1 (Summer 2002).
Maria Szymanowska Society 

Conference papers from the 2014 Maria Szymanowska Symposium in Annales / Académie Polonaise des Sciences 16. (Centres Scientifique à Paris: Varsovie-Paris, 2014).
 Scores by Maria Szymanowska in digital library Polona

1789 births
1831 deaths
19th-century classical composers
19th-century classical pianists
19th-century keyboardists
19th-century Polish musicians
19th-century Polish people
Adam Mickiewicz
Women classical composers
Classical pianists from the Russian Empire
Composers from the Russian Empire
People from the Russian Empire of Polish descent
Johann Wolfgang von Goethe
Musicians from Warsaw
Polish classical pianists
Polish people of Jewish descent
Polish Romantic composers
Polish salon-holders
Polish women pianists
Women classical pianists
19th-century women composers
Polish women composers
19th-century women pianists